Jonathan, Jonny, or Jon Smith may refer to:

Arts and entertainment
Jonathan Smith (novelist) (born 1942), English novelist and playwright
Jon Robert Smith (born 1945), American tenor saxophonist
Lil Jon (Jonathan H. Smith, born 1971), American rap music producer
Jonny Smith (journalist) (born 1979), English television presenter
Jonathan Smith, American drummer in the band Days Difference
Jonathan Smith, aka Jono MOFO, bassist for the band A Place to Bury Strangers

Sports

American football
Jonathan Smith (American football coach) (born 1979), American college football coach and player
Jonathan Smith (wide receiver) (born 1981), American NFL football wide receiver
Jonathan Smith (running back) (born 1981), American football running back

Association football (soccer)
Jonathan Smith (footballer, born 1891), English player with QPR, Swansea Town; on List of Manchester City F.C. players
Jonathan Smith (footballer, born 1986), English footballer
Jonathan Smith (footballer, born 1988), English footballer
Jonny Smith (footballer) (born 1997), English footballer

Other sports
Jonathan Smith (tennis) (born 1955), British tennis player
Jonathan Smith (rower) (born 1961), American rower
Jonathan Smith (rugby league) (born 1979), New Zealand rugby league footballer
Jonathan Smith (racing driver) (born 1986), American race car driver

Others
Jonathan Bayard Smith (1742–1812), American merchant, delegate to the Continental Congress
Jonathan J. Smith (1844–1916), American politician
Jonathan Z. Smith (1938–2017), American historian of religions
Jon Michael Smith (born 1938), American scientist and engineer
Jonathan Smith (priest) (born 1955), Church of England priest and Archdeacon of St Albans
Jonathan Smith (games programmer) (1967–2010), British games programmer
Jonathan Smith (psychologist), British psychology professor

See also
Johnny Smith (disambiguation)
Jonty Smith (born 1992), South African rower
John Smith (disambiguation)